There have been two versions of the anthology television series The Outer Limits. Each has its own episode list.

Overview

 List of The Outer Limits (1963 TV series) episodes
 List of The Outer Limits (1995 TV series) episodes

 
 
 
Outer Limits, The
Outer Limits, The